Malin Dahlström (born 26 August 1989) is a Swedish athlete who specialises in the pole vault. She represented her country at the 2011 World Championships without qualifying for the final.

Her personal bests in the event are 4.50 metres outdoors (Rottach-Egern 2012) and 4.52 metres indoors (Dresden 2014).

Competition record

References

1989 births
Living people
Swedish female pole vaulters
World Athletics Championships athletes for Sweden